Torvald Högström (16 February 1926 – 28 May 2010) was a Finnish racing cyclist. He won the Finnish national road race title in 1951. He competed in three events at the 1948 Summer Olympics.

References

External links
 

1926 births
2010 deaths
Finnish male cyclists
People from Porvoo
Olympic cyclists of Finland
Cyclists at the 1948 Summer Olympics
Sportspeople from Uusimaa